Live from the Roxy is a live album by the American rock musician Bob Welch, recorded in 1981, released in 2004, and later issued onto LP in 2021. Welch had been a member of Fleetwood Mac from 1971 to 1974, and this album features appearances by many members of that band.

Some releases omit "12 Bar Blues in A", and some incorrectly list "Remember Me" as "Don't You Think It's Time". This track originally featured on Fleetwood Mac's 1973 album Penguin. Other Fleetwood Mac songs included were "Hypnotized", from Mystery to Me; "Sentimental Lady" from Bare Trees; "Rattlesnake Shake" from Then Play On, and "Gold Dust Woman" from Rumours.

"Big Towne, 2061" and "Black Book" were songs by Paris, the band that Welch formed after he left Fleetwood Mac. "Hot Love, Cold World", "Outskirts" and "Ebony Eyes" first appeared on his first solo album French Kiss. "Precious Love" featured on 1979's Three Hearts, and "It's What Ya Don't Say", "Remember", "Two to Do" and "Bend Me, Shape Me" were originally released on his 1981 album Bob Welch.

Track listing

Credits
Bob Welch – vocals, guitar
Stevie Nicks – vocals, tambourine (on 12, 13 & 15)
Robbie Patton – vocals (on 11)
Ann Wilson – vocals (on 16)
Joey Brasler – guitar
Bob Weston – guitar (on 14)
Christine McVie – vocals, keyboards (on 4, 5, 11, 14, 15 & 16)
David Adelstein – keyboards
Robin Sylvester – bass guitar
John McVie – bass guitar (on 4)
Mick Fleetwood – drums, percussion (on 4, 5, 12, 15 & 16)
Carmine Appice – drums (on 8 & 16)
Alvin Taylor – drums, percussion
Howard Leese - guitar (on 16)
Mark Stein - keyboards (on 16)

Production
Produced by Bob Welch

References

2004 live albums
Bob Welch (musician) albums